Glyadki is a rural locality (a village) in Bavlenskoye Rural Settlement, Kolchuginsky District, Vladimir Oblast, Russia. The population was 7 as of 2010.

Geography 
Glyadki is located 23 km northeast of Kolchugino (the district's administrative centre) by road. Bavleny is the nearest rural locality.

References 

Rural localities in Kolchuginsky District